State Trunk Highway 241 (often called Highway 241, STH-241 or WIS 241) is a  state highway in Racine and Milwaukee counties in Wisconsin, United States.

Route description
WIS 241 runs north–south in southeast Wisconsin from the town of Raymond into Milwaukee, mostly along a previous routing of US Highway 41 (US 41), for which it is named. The former US 41 routing north of the Milwaukee–Racine county line is locally known as 27th Street.

History
WIS 241 was created in 1999 when state highway officials decided to reroute US 41 off South 27th Street in Milwaukee. The change was done because residents on the section north of West Forest Home Avenue objected to a proposed widening project. In response, the entire section of US 41 from the Milwaukee–Racine county line to the Stadium Freeway (also known as WIS 341) was moved east to run on the North–South Freeway with Interstate 94 (I-94). This would eventually lead to the designation of the new US 41 routing along Interstate 894 and onto I-94 south as Interstate 41 in 2015.

Until a reconstruction in 2018, the southern terminus of the highway was through a direct merger via north-south ramps with I-94 at the county line. The ramp was then removed, and its terminus was moved a mile south to Seven Mile Road along the western I-94, where it turns onto for a quarter mile from the west I-94 frontage road and terminates at the northbound on/off ramp with I-94.

Major intersections

See also

References

External links

 WIS 241 at Wisconsin Highway Ends

241
Transportation in Racine County, Wisconsin
Transportation in Milwaukee County, Wisconsin
U.S. Route 41